The Toronto Blue Ice Jets were a Junior ice hockey team based out of Thornhill, Ontario, Canada. The team played in the Greater Metro Junior A Hockey League (GMHL).

History

The Jets were Thornhill's only Junior hockey team after the Ontario Provincial Junior A Hockey League's Toronto Thunderbirds relocated to King City to become the Villanova Knights.

They were founded as the Toronto Canada Moose in the inaugural year of the GMHL in the 2006–07 season as one of seven original league members. The first game took place on September 9, 2006, against the King Wild in Thornhill, Ontario resulting in a 5-1 loss.  On September 11, 2006, the team earned their first win defeating the Deseronto Thunder by a score of 5-2. The Moose finished their inaugural season with a 19-20-0-3 record. They placed fifth in the league after a season long race for fourth with the Deseronto Thunder and Nipissing Alouettes.  Their first playoff appearance put them up against the King Wild in the league quarterfinals.  Unfortunately, the Moose were eliminated in five games in a best-of-seven series (3-8, 8-3, 3-5, 1-9, 2-6).

The Moose started their second season off very slowly.  After breaking a long losing streak, the Moose managed to earn fourteen more wins but still only finished in eleventh place in the now thirteen team league.  In the first round, the Moose were picked to oppose the top seeded Bradford Rattlers.  The Moose managed to keep it close over the first three games but the Rattlers still swept the series in four games.

On January 3, 2008, the Moose played against Kazakhstan's Torpedo UST-Kamenogorsk Under-18 squad in an exhibition game.  Despite rallying to tie the game 4-4 at the end of the second, the Moose fell to the Torpedo 8-5.

In spring 2013, the Moose were renamed the Blue Ice Jets. On September 6, 2013, the Blue Ice Jets played their first game since changing ownership against South Muskoka Shield and lost 5-4. The first win under the Blue Ice Jets name took place on September 7, 2013 against the Bobcaygeon Bucks in Thornhill, Ontario. The Blue Ice Jets beat the Bucks 17-2.

For the 2016–17 season, the Blue Ice Jets were scheduled to play their first home game on September 6, 2016. However, the team never took the ice and within a week the Blue Ice Jets had been removed from the GMHL. On September 13, the GMHL president stated that the Blue Ice Jets had taken the season off and possibly plans to relocate for the next season.

Season-by-season records

Playoffs

2007 Lost quarter-final
King Wild defeated Toronto Canada Moose 4-games-to-1 in quarter-final
2008 Lost bye round
Bradford Rattlers defeated Toronto Canada Moose 4-games-to-none in bye round
2009 Lost division quarter-final
Bradford Rattlers defeated Toronto Canada Moose 3-games-to-2 in division quarter-final
2010 Lost qualifier series
Toronto Canada Moose defeated Oro-Medonte 77's 6-4 in last minute qualifier
Algoma Avalanche defeated Toronto Canada Moose 2-games-to-1 in qualifier series
2011 Lost semi-final
Toronto Canada Moose defeated Vaughan Wild 9-1 in last minute qualifier
Toronto Canada Moose defeated Shelburne Red Wings 2-games-to-none in qualifier
Toronto Canada Moose defeated Jamestown Jets 3-games-to-1 in quarter-final
Elliot Lake Bobcats defeated Toronto Canada Moose 4-games-to-none in semi-final
2012 Lost bye round
Deseronto Storm defeated Toronto Canada Moose 2-games-to-none in bye round
2013 Lost division quarter-final
Bradford Bulls defeated Toronto Canada Moose 3-games-to-1 in division quarter-final
2014 Lost division semi-final
Toronto Blue Ice Jets defeated Halton Ravens 3-games-to-none in division quarter-final
Bradford Rattlers defeated Toronto Blue Ice Jets 3-games-to-1 in division semi-final
2015 Lost conference quarter-final
Toronto Blue Ice Jets defeated Rattlers 3-games-to-2 in division semi-final
Toronto Attack defeated Toronto Blue Ice Jets 3-games-to-0 in conference semi-final
2016 Lost qualifier game
North York Renegades defeated Toronto Blue Ice Jets 5–1 in qualifier game

References

External links
Blue Ice Jets Webpage

2006 establishments in Ontario
Ice hockey clubs established in 2006
Ice hockey teams in Ontario
Sport in Markham, Ontario